Daniel Spiller (born 10 October 1981) is an English former professional footballer.

Career
Spiller began his professional career with Gillingham. A product of the club's youth system, he signed his first professional contract in 2000 but saw his first season ravaged by injury and did not make his league debut in the 2001–02 season. In January 2002, he joined League of Ireland Premier Division side Longford Town on loan along with Richard Rose. Spiller came to the fore during the 2003–04 season when he was player of the season after a string of man-of-the-match performances. He finished the season by signing a contract keeping him at Priestfield Stadium until 2007. In 2004 West Ham tabled a bid of £750,000 for Spiller which was subsequently turned down by the Gillingham board. Gillingham chairman Paul Scally was quoted as saying "anything under a million is an insult".

Predominantly a midfielder, Spiller has also played as a striker, and right-back, although his preferred position is in central midfield.

On 11 June 2007, it was announced that Spiller had agreed terms to join Millwall on 1 July 2007. After struggling with injuries, Spiller only managed 10 appearances for Millwall, scoring one goal in a 1–0 home victory over Cheltenham Town. On 27 May 2009, Spiller was released from his contract at Millwall.

Spiller signed on non-contract terms with Wycombe Wanderers for a month during August 2009, before leaving the club to sign for Welling United on 4 September 2009. After making one appearance and spending 6 days with Welling, Spiller joined League Two side Dagenham & Redbridge on a contract until January 2010. His debut for Dagenham & Redbridge came on 12 September when he came on as a substitute for Danny Green in a 2–1 home win against Chesterfield.

When Andy Hessenthaler re-joined Gillingham as manager, he brought Spiller in on trial, and signed him on a five-month contract. He made his second debut for Gillingham in a 1–1 home draw against Cheltenham Town on 7 August 2010, and the contract was extended for a further year and a half in December 2010.

Spiller signed a two-year contract with Conference Premier side Luton Town on 17 June 2012 after his release from Gillingham. He injured his Achilles tendon shortly after signing and did not play a single game for the club throughout the 2012–13 season. After numerous unsuccessful operations, Luton terminated Spiller's contract in July 2013, stating that the long-term prognosis of his injury was "showing little signs of improvement".

On 12 February 2015, Spiller signed for Isthmian League Division One South side Herne Bay. Three days later he netted the second goal in a 2-0 derby victory against Ramsgate.

Honours

Individual 

 Gillingham Young Player of the Season: 2002–03
 Gillingham Player of the Season: 2003–04

References

External links

1981 births
Sportspeople from Maidstone
Living people
Association football midfielders
English footballers
Gillingham F.C. players
Longford Town F.C. players
Millwall F.C. players
Wycombe Wanderers F.C. players
Welling United F.C. players
Dagenham & Redbridge F.C. players
Luton Town F.C. players
English Football League players
National League (English football) players
League of Ireland players
Expatriate association footballers in the Republic of Ireland